The 2010 season was Perak's 7th consecutive season in the Malaysian Super League.

Players

First-team squad

Coaching staff

Competitions

Super League

League table

Malaysia FA Cup

The competition involved 30 teams — 16 Super League and 14 Premier League sides.

First round

Second round

Malaysia Cup

The competition began on 14 September 2010 and concluded on 30 October 2010 with the final, held at National Stadium, Bukit Jalil. A total of 16 teams took part in the competition. The teams were divided into 4 groups of 4 teams.

Group stage

The group leaders and runners-up teams in the groups after 6 matches qualified to the quarterfinals.

References

Perak F.C. seasons
Malaysian football clubs 2010 season